Early Day Miners are a band from southern Indiana, United States who released records on the Bloomington, Indiana based label Secretly Canadian. The band has released seven full-length records.

Their first CD Placer Found was released April 2000 on Western Vinyl.

Recent activity 
In 2018 Early Day Miners embarked on two North American tours.
In 2013 Early Day Miners' (EDM) song "Milking The Moon" from Night People was featured on Showtime series Shameless. Season 3, Episode 10.
July 2011 saw the release of their seventh full-length album entitled Night People.
September 2009 Early Day Miners released their sixth full-length album on Secretly Canadian entitled The Treatment.
In 2006 Early Day Miners toured with band Wilco.
Early Day Miners have toured extensively through EU and United States.
Early Day Miners' music was featured in the soundtrack to the NBC series Quarterlife.

Discography 
Albums
 2000: Placer Found (Western Vinyl)
 2002: Let Us Garlands Bring (Secretly Canadian)
 2003: Jefferson At Rest (Secretly Canadian)
 2003: Sonograph EP (Acuarela)
 2005: All Harm Ends Here (Secretly Canadian)
 2006: Offshore (Secretly Canadian)
 2009: The Treatment (Secretly Canadian)
 2011: Night People (Western Vinyl)

Singles and split releases
 2001: Southern Myth
 2001: Last Snow
 2002: Stateless
 2003: Deep Harbor (Burnt Toast Vinyl)
 2018: Night Suit (For Tarah Cards) / Sterling Provisions
 2019: The Ongoing Moment EP

Compilation appearances
SC 100
Pulse from Mid America
Acuarela Songs 3
For Jonathan
Green UFOs
Talitres is 5

References

External links 
Official site
 Early Day Miners Blog
 Secretly Canadian Early Day Miners site 
 Early Day Miners MySpace page
 Early Day Miners Discogs Discography
 Drowned In Sound Early Day Miners Discography History 
Daytrotter Session
Pitchfork Reviews
[ AllMusic Guide Biography]

Alternative rock groups from Indiana
Indie rock musical groups from Indiana
Sadcore and slowcore groups
Western Vinyl artists
Secretly Canadian artists